Miss Smith To You! is the third album by Lavay Smith & Her Red Hot Skillet Lickers. The album has nine covers of music from the 1930s to the 1950s, plus three original tunes written by bandleader Lavay Smith and pianist and arranger Chris Seibert.

Track listing

Personnel 

Lavay Smith & Her Red Hot Skillet Lickers
Lavay Smith – vocals
Chris Seibert – piano
Bill Ortiz – trumpets
Mike Olmos – trumpets (tracks 1, 2, 5 - 11)
Allen Smith – trumpets (tracks 3, 4, 12)
Danny Armstrong – vocals (track 8, 9, 11, 12), trombone
Charles McNeal - alto saxophone
Jules Broussard – alto saxophone (tracks 9, 10)
Howard Wiley – tenor saxophone (tracks 1, 2, 5 - 11)
Ron Stallings – tenor saxophone (tracks 3, 4, 12)
Pete Cornell – baritone saxophone (tracks 1, 2, 5 - 11)
David Ewell – string bass (tracks 1, 2, 5 - 11)
Marcus Shelby – string bass (tracks 3, 4, 12)
Darrell Green – drums

Production
Lavay Smith - producer
Chris Seibert – producer, mixing
Jeff Cressman – recorded at Bay Records
James Frazer - assistant engineer, additional recording
Dan Feiszli - mixing at What's for Lunch Studios
Ken Lee - mastering
Kathrin Miller – cover photography, album design

References

External links 

2009 albums